South Park is a commercial district in southwestern Downtown Los Angeles, California. It is the location of the Los Angeles Convention Center, the Crypto.com Arena, and the "L.A. Live" entertainment complex.

History
At the beginning of the 21st century the area began to rapidly transform with infill development. Luxury apartments and condominiums with ground floor retail began construction in the 2000s. The district's proximity to the University of Southern California, as well as the A Line and E Line light rail lines, have made it an attractive area for young professionals. As with many neighborhood transformations, this change in demographics has a few concerned about displacement and gentrification issues.

Geography
According to the City of Los Angeles:

Bordering the district are Pico-Union on the west, West Adams on the southwest, South Los Angeles district on the southeast, the Warehouse District on the southeast, and the Financial District on the northeast.  Major thoroughfares include Venice, Pico and Olympic Boulevards, Grand Avenue, and Figueroa Street. The A Line light rail and E Line light rail stop in the district at the Pico/Chick Hearn station.

References